Gorgyra heterochrus, the white-tufted leaf sitter, is a butterfly in the family Hesperiidae. It is found in Guinea, Sierra Leone, Liberia, Ivory Coast, Ghana, Nigeria, Cameroon and the Central African Republic. The habitat consists of forests.

References

Butterflies described in 1890
Erionotini
Butterflies of Africa